Yauri District, also known as Espinar or Kiskachay District, is one of eight districts of the Espinar Province in Peru. Its seat is Yauri (Yawri).

Geography 
Other mountains are listed below:

See also 
 K'anamarka

References